The Iowa Oaks is a Grade III American Thoroughbred horse race for three years old fillies, over a distance of  miles on the dirt held annually in early July at Prairie Meadows in Altoona, Iowa.  The event currently carries a purse of $225,000.

History 
The race was inaugurated in 1989 at a distance of 1 mile in was run in late April. 

However, the event was idle for five years from 1990 to 1994. When the track administration resumed the event it was known as the Heartland Oaks and it was extended to the current distance of  miles and scheduled in July. In 1995 the racetrack added slot machines and the venue was able to increase stakes thus attracting better quality horses. In 1998 the administration of the track reverted the name of the event back to the Iowa Derby. 

In 2004 the event was upgraded to Grade III.

In 2020, the purse for the race was reduced, along with the purses for the Cornhusker Handicap and Iowa Derby, due to the COVID-19 pandemic.

Records
Speed record: 
  miles – 1:41.64  –  Wildwood Royal  (2003)

Margins: 
  lengths – Unbridled Elaine  (2001) 
 
Most wins by a jockey: 
 2 – Ricardo Santana Jr.  (2018, 2019)
 2 – Rafael Bejarano   (2006, 2007)
 2 – Robert Dean Williams   (1997, 1998)

Most wins by a trainer:
 4 – Steven M. Asmussen (1997, 2009, 2018, 2019)

Most wins by an owner:
 2 – Claiborne Farm (2000, 2013)
 2 – Winchell Thoroughbreds (1997, 2009)

Winners

References 

Graded stakes races in the United States
Grade 3 stakes races in the United States
1989 establishments in Iowa
Flat horse races for three-year-old fillies
Recurring sporting events established in 1989